Vyacheslav Jevtushenko (born 26 July 1981) is a Swedish former professional footballer who played as a midfielder. Following his retirement from playing, he worked as a coach.

Beside Swedish citizenship, he has a Ukrainian as well.

He is a son of the Soviet player Vadym Yevtushenko.

References

External links
 SvFF profile
 Jevtushenko-jr: I had a potential to play for AIK. Football. 7 May 2012

1981 births
Living people
Footballers from Kyiv
Ukrainian emigrants to Sweden
Stockholm School of Economics alumni
Association football midfielders
Swedish footballers
AIK Fotboll players
IK Brage players
Allsvenskan players
Superettan players
Naturalized citizens of Sweden